

List of Colonial and Provincial Heads of Cabinda

Coastal enclave, part of present-day Angola

See also
Cabinda
Heads of state of Cabinda
Heads of government of Cabinda
Angola
Heads of state of Angola
Heads of government of Angola
President of Angola
Prime Minister of Angola
Colonial heads of Angola
Lists of office-holders

Political history of Portugal
Governors of Cabinda
Government of Angola

Cabinda